Special Forces is the fifth studio album by American rock band 38 Special, released on May 4, 1982, by A&M Records. The band embarked on the Special Forces Tour to support the album.

Special Forces peaked at number 10 on the Billboard 200, making it the band's highest-charting studio album in the United States. Three of the four charted singles from the album were co-written with Survivor's Jim Peterik, including "Caught Up in You", the band's first Top 10 hit on the Billboard Hot 100.

Track listing
"Caught Up in You" (Don Barnes, Jeff Carlisi, Jim Peterik) - 4:37
"Back Door Stranger" (Carlisi, Larry Steele, Donnie Van Zant) - 4:38
"Back on the Track" (Carlisi, Steele, Van Zant) - 4:45
"Chain Lightnin'" (Barnes, Peterik, Van Zant) - 5:01
"Rough-Housin'" (Barnes, Steele, Van Zant) - 4:08
"You Keep Runnin' Away" (Barnes, Carlisi, Peterik) - 3:56
"Breakin' Loose" (Carlisi, Jack Grondin, Steele, Van Zant) - 3:32
"Take 'Em Out" (Barnes, Carlisi, Steele, Van Zant) - 4:07
"Firestarter" (Barnes, Steele, Van Zant) - 5:01

Personnel
Donnie Van Zant - lead vocals (2, 3, 5, 7, 8, 9), backing vocals
Don Barnes - guitar; lead vocals on tracks 1, 4, 5, 6, 8; backing vocals
Jeff Carlisi - guitar, steel guitar
Larry Junstrom - bass guitar
Steve Brookins - drums
Jack Grondin - drums

Additional Personnel
Terry Emery - percussion, piano
Steve McRay - keyboards
Jimmy Barnes - harmonica, harp
Carol Bristow - vocals, backing vocals
Lu Moss - vocals, backing vocals

Production
Producers: Don Barnes, Jeff Carlisi, Rodney Mills
Engineers: Rodney Mills, Greg Quesnel
Art direction: Jeffrey Kent Ayeroff
Design: Philip Gips
Cover art concept: Philip Gips
Cover art painting: Larry Gerber
Mastering: Bob Ludwig

Charts
Album - Billboard (United States)

Singles - Billboard (United States)

References

38 Special (band) albums
1982 albums
A&M Records albums
Albums produced by Rodney Mills